The Lehigh Coal & Navigation Company was a mining and transportation company headquartered in Mauch Chunk, Pennsylvania, now known as Jim Thorpe, Pennsylvania. The company operated from 1818 until its dissolution in 1964 and played an early and influential role in the rise of the American Industrial Revolution and early U.S. industrialization. The company ultimately encompassed source industries, transport, and manufacturing, making it the first vertically integrated U.S. company.

Building on two predecessor companies incorporated in 1818, founders Erskine Hazard and Josiah White entered the coal industry to serve customers seeking a steady supply of fuel for foundries and mills on the falls of the Schuylkill River. Its role in accelerating regional industrial development by taking on civil engineering challenges initially thought impossible and creating important transport and mining infrastructure, proved influential in spearheading the American Industrial Revolution The company also established the Lehigh Canal, whose construction began in 1818. The Lehigh Canal became usable in 1820, was improved further between 1821 and 1824, and was finally transformed into a two-way canal between 1827 and 1829. The Lehigh Canal played a hugely influential role in the nation's ability to transport anthracite coal, a primary energy source at the time, to the company's primary markets in the Northeastern United States.

By the early 1830s, the Lehigh Canal and its bridges along the Delaware River inspired the development and connection of four other regional canals.

History
Lehigh Coal & Navigation Company's success, along with White's reputation for advancing the state of mining and civil engineering, jumpstarted America's brief Canal Age. It also spurred historically significant investments in raw materials and bulk transportation infrastructure projects. The company also supported funding efforts behind the Schuylkill Canal project, which began in 1814, and was finally funded and finished with the company's support. White and Hazard had backed the Schuylkill project since their mills were on the River, but became disgusted with the timid investment and management attitudes of its board, so they explored property and feasibility examinations elsewhere in 1814–1815 and petitioned to build the canal that next year.<ref
 name=DEL&LHcanals>
</ref>

Upon their return, the company's two founders took over Lehigh Coal Mining Company's mines and mining rights in a 20-year lease.<ref
 name=CornRent>"Soon after this failure, Josiah White and Erskine Hazard, who were engaged in the manufacture of wire at the Falls of Schuylkill, having obtained good results in their experiments with the coal they had purchased from Cist, Miner and Robinson, secured control of the entire property of the Lehigh Coal Mine Company under the terms of a lease for twenty years.

George F. A. Hanto joined them in the venture and was largely depended upon to secure the necessary financial assistance to make the property productive.

Under the conditions of the lease, it was stipulated that, after a given time for preparation, they should deliver for their own benefit at least forty thousand bushels of coal annually in Philadelphia and the surrounding districts, and should pay, if demanded, one ear of corn as a yearly rental.", Brenckman, pp. 77–78</ref> built the Lehigh and Susquehanna Railroad and had its hands in many other northeastern Pennsylvania shortline railroads, spurs, and subsidiaries; created the Ashley Planes and made or supported means to other novel solutions of transport problems; and created transport corridors still important today.It also pioneered the mining of anthracite coal in the United States, acquiring virtually the entire eastern lobe of the Southern Pennsylvania Coal Region, and brought in Welsh experts to bootstrap Iron production using blast furnace technology in the Lehigh Valley, building the first six such furnaces and puddling furnaces to create steel, which the company then provided to its own wire rope (steel cable) manufactury, the countries first it set up in Mauch Chunk. Completing the vertical integration, the wire ropes were then marketed to other mining operations, cable railways, and other industries needing high tensile reliability in managing weighty loads.

Buying out partner George Hauto, and forming the Lehigh Coal & Navigation Company (LC&N) in 1822 by combining the Lehigh Coal Mining Company (1893), the Lehigh Coal Company (then, leasing the lCMC's properties) and the Lehigh Navigation Company, it represented the first merger of interlocking companies in the United States. Five years later, the company built the Mauch Chunk and Summit Hill Railroad, the first coal railroad and just the second railroad company in the country to be constructed after the Granite Railroad of Quincy, Massachusetts. It was founded by industrialists Josiah White (1780–1850) and Erskine Hazard (1790–1865), who sought to improve delivery of coal to markets. and a thickly accented German immigrant miner named Hauto.<ref
 name="EarOcorn">Hurlbert, Chapter III, quote: Believing that coal could be obtained more cheaply from Mauch Chunk than from the mines along the Schuylkill, White, Hauto, and Hazard formed a company, entered into negotiation with the owners of the Lehigh mines, and obtained the lease of their properties for a period of twenty years at an annual rental of one ear of corn.</ref>

The company is known in the Lehigh Valley as the "Old Company", as distinct from the later 1988–2010 company: the nearly same named Lehigh Coal and Navigation Company, the "New Company", to the people of the region.

Development

In 1792, a hunter named Philip Ginter discovered coal in the region on Sharpe Mountain— on Pisgah Ridge near today's Summit Hill close to the border between Schuylkill and Carbon counties. The Lehigh Coal Mine Company was founded the following year, but management proved weak and tried to operate in an absentee mode. Company personnel attempted to trek to the mine site, dig the coal, use mules to bring bags of it to the Lehigh River, n cut down trees and build crude arks near Lausanne Landing and then shoot the rapids of the Lehigh River, hoping to reach the Delaware River. The Lehigh Coal Mining Company was sporadically successfully in getting anthracite coal to Philadelphia and its rights were eventually absorbed by the Lehigh Coal & Navigation Company, which leased their own operational rights from their predecessor, the Lehigh Coal Company.

Lehigh Coal Mine Company
The Lehigh Coal Mine Company (LCMC) was founded in 1792 (incorporated 1793) with enough money to buy  in and around the Panther Creek Valley and along Pisgah Mountain, and the aim of hauling anthracite coal from the large deposits on Pisgah Mountain near what is now Summit Hill, Pennsylvania, to Philadelphia via mule train to arks built near Lausanne on the Lehigh and Delaware Rivers. The mining camps were over nine miles from the Lehigh River at Mauch Chunk. Sporadically active between the years of 1792 and 1814, the Lehigh Coal Mine Company was able to sell all of the coal it could mine to fuel-hungry markets but lost many a boatload on the rough waters of the unimproved Lehigh River, contributing to lost operating profits for the company and sometimes outright losses.<ref
 name=HoCC-594>Brenckman's History of Carbon County, pp. 594: The task which Josiah White and Erskine Hazard undertook, that of making the Lehigh a navigable stream, was one which had before been several times attempted, and as often abandoned as too expensive and difficult to be successfully carried out.  The Legislature was early aware of the importance of the navigation of this stream, and in 1771 passed a law for its improvement.  Subsequent laws for the same object were enacted in 1791, 1794, 1798, 1810, 1814, and 1816, and a company had been formed under one of them which expended upwards of thirty thousand dollars in clearing out channels, one of which they attempted to make through the ledges of slate about seven miles above Allentown, though they soon relinquished the work.</ref>

Eventually, the owners sold some coal to Josiah White and Erskine Hazard, who operated a wire mill foundry at the Schuylkill River falls near Philadelphia. White and Hazard were delighted by the quality of the fuel, and subsequently bought the LCMC's final two barges to survive the trip down the Lehigh. Convinced they could much improve the reliability of its delivery, they began in 1815 to inquire after the rights to mine the LCMC's coal and hatched a plan to improve the navigation on the Lehigh as a key step.

Lehigh Coal Company
White and Hazard very shortly found themselves on the receiving end of investor criticisms that the improvements and mining operation at Summit Hill were failing and were both considered crackpot schemes. The majority opinion was that improvements were possible, but that coal mining was less likely to succeed. Accordingly, they secured additional investors by forming two companies, the Lehigh Coal Company (LCC) and the Lehigh Navigation Company, and began seeking legislative approval for improving the Lehigh River's navigation.

In 1817, they leased the Lehigh Coal Mine's properties and took over operations, incorporating it on October 21, 1818, as the Lehigh Coal Company. They petitioned the legislature and proposed acquiring rights to make improvements to the Lehigh River for which there had been a string of supportive legislation going back decades. In 1820, White and Hazard bought out their partner Hauto and dissolved the Lehigh Coal Company on April 21, 1820.

White and Hazard found a wide divergence of opinion on whether the Lehigh River could be tamed, and even fewer believed that the mining of coal from the Lehigh River's surrounding lands was feasible. On three separate occasions, funds were raised to improve the Lehigh River's functionality. By 1820, the two companies had a marginal level of navigability on the Lehigh over four years ahead of their targeted 1824 deadline. Coal was transported by mule track from Summit Hill to a loading chute at the huge slack water pool at Mauch Chunk.

Riding this success, the two companies were merged into the Lehigh Coal & Navigation Company, which resolved to apply American Canal era technology, including canals, locks, and rails to bring coal to their foundries and the stoves and furnaces of Philadelphia and beyond.

On March 20, 1818, the company was granted various powers they sought to secure navigation in the Lehigh River, including with boats loaded with one hundred barrels, or ten tons on coal. Pennsylvania's state government kept an eye on the operation, however, and a minority felt the two men might succeed. The state reserved the right to compel the adoption of a complete system of slack-water navigation from Easton to Stoddartsville if the company did not succeed satisfactorily.

Capital was subscribed by a patriotic public on condition that a committee of stockholders go over the Lehigh River ground and pass judgment on the probable success of the effort. The report was favorable so far as the improvement of the Lehigh River was concerned. But the nine-mile road from the river to the mines was unanimously voted impracticable. "To give you an idea of the country over which the road is to pass," wrote one of the commissioners, "I need only tell you that I considered it quite an easement when the wheel of my carriage struck a stump instead of a stone." The public, meanwhile, was divided. Some held that the attempt to operate the coal mine was farcical, but that the improvement of the Lehigh River was an undertaking of great value and would prove profitable to investors. Others were just as positive that improvement's to the river's navigation would follow the fate of so many similar enterprises but that a fortune was in store for those who invested in the Lehigh mines.

The direct result of the examiners' report and of the public debate ultimately was the organization of the first interlocking companies in American commercial history. The Lehigh Navigation Company was formed with a capital stock of $150,000 and the Lehigh Coal Company was launched with capital stock of $55,000. This formed one of the most striking illustrations in American history of the dependence of a commercial venture upon methods of inland transportation. The Lehigh Navigation Company proceeded to build its dams and walls while the Lehigh Coal Company constructed the first roadway in America built on the principle, which was later adopted by the railway, of dividing the total distance by the total descent in order to determine the grade. The Lehigh Navigation Company, then suffering from an unprecedented dearth of water, adopted White's invention of sluice gates connecting with pools that could be filled with reserve water to be drawn upon as needed for navigation. By 1819, the depth of water between Mauch Chunk and Easton was obtained. The two companies were immediately amalgamated under the title of the Lehigh Coal and Navigation Company. By 1823, the two companies delivered over two thousand tons of coal to market.

Lehigh Navigation Company
Having displayed great technological skills by creating the world's first iron wire suspension bridge, which spanned the Schuylkill River at their wire works, White and Hazard schemed with other industrialists to secure a reliable source of anthracite.

To move the coal to market, they entered political negotiations to acquire rights to tame the turbulent and rapids-ridden Lehigh River for navigation. By 1817–18, they had organized the separate Lehigh Navigation Company and had written stock flyers announcing plans to deliver  barge loads of coal regularly to Philadelphia by 1824. The LCMC had trouble delivering Anthracite to Philadelphia at costs cheaper than imported Bituminous Coal from Britain or Virginia. Their last expedition had been sent out in 1813 during the war & blockade caused bituminous shortages, and by the time five arks were sent down river, three sank, leaving the directors of LCMC disgusted and unwilling to fund more losses.

The company began to prepare plans and surveyed sites, and when the state legislature approved the river work in 1818, immediately hired teams of men and began to install locks, dams, and weirs, including water management gates of their own novel design.

A brief history of the navigations beginnings as Brenckman related in 1884:

The canal head end needed a location where barges could be built and timber and coal could be brought into slack water. The challenge was to do it above the gap made by the east end of Mount Pisgah, a hard rock knob that towers 900 feet above the Lehigh River towns Jim Thorpe (formerly Mauch Chunk) to the towns west, and Nesquehoning to its north. Both towns are built into the flanks, the traverses, of the mountain, with flats along the river banks. (A few decades later, railroads would follow the canals.)

Within the next two years, White and Hazard constructed a descending navigation system that used their unique "bear trap" or hydrostatic locks, which allowed the passage of coal boats by means of artificial floods. The coal arrived at the head end from the mines at Summit Hill or down along the steep mule trail from near the headwaters of Panther Creek. It floated down the navigation; at journey's end, the barges were sold as fuel or for Delaware basin transports.

The navigation company began shipping significant quantities of coal by early 1819, ahead of expectations, and attained their goal of regular shipments in 1820.<ref
 name=HistCC02>

</ref>

In 1820, the company was combined with the Lehigh Coal Company with the ouster of George Hauto, but was not rechartered officially until 1822.

Lehigh Coal & Navigation Company
By late 1820, four years ahead of their prospectus's targeted schedule, the unfinished but much improved Lehigh Valley watercourse began reliably transporting large amounts of coal to White's mills and Philadelphia. The nearly 370 tons of coal brought to market that year not only salved the winter's fuel shortage but created a temporary glut. A few months later, they merged the LCC and the Lehigh Navigation Company. In late 1821, they filed papers to incorporate Lehigh Coal & Lehigh Navigation, which took effect in 1822.

Non-mining Ventures
Under both White and Hazard, as operations managers from 1822 through 1865, Lehigh Coal & Navigation Company was a company constantly looking for innovative solutions to increase business and revenues. The vertical integration many economists credit them with inventing would appeal to them as a very natural way to control costs, hence maximize profitability. The two, and the various members of the corporate board often heard of ideas that separately(?) or together needed financial investment which the company would often join as investors, and often end up providing a later critical boost of finishing financing, investing in such ventures directly, or buying out at a later time as subsidiaries as things developed a proof of concept, track record, better promise, or dependency on another business.

Blast Furnaces

Grand Lehigh Canal-Upper Canal Division
The June 6, 1862 flood proved to show a fatal flaw in White's grand dream. The Upper Grand contributed to its own demise in that the dams and locks necessary to allow the coal barges to travel on the river meant that huge pools of water sat at the ready. Once the heavy June rains began, and dams began to be breached, devastating tidal waves of flood water burst dam after dam causing a great flood and loss of life.

John J. Leisenring Jr., then Superintendent of the LCN & Co. estimated that 200 people lost their lives from White Haven down to Lehighton. The state legislature stepped in and prohibited the LCN & Co. from rebuilding.<ref
 name=DEL&LHcanals/>

Railroads
Primary reference

Summit Hill and Mauch Chunk Railroad
 name=PoorSH&MC>
</ref> The work went quickly since the right-of-way surveyed by White (well before 1818's charter) ran along the virtually uniform gradient created by grading the original mule trail, work overseen by Hazard in 1818.

Room Run Railroad
The Room Run or Rhume Run Railroad was a shortline coal road built by Josiah White from a ravine in the Nesquehoning Valley

Non-railroad Companies
During the winters ending in 1821–1823, the partners learned a lot about icing damage and canal construction to prevent heavy damages by sustaining them, but also learned some damages would be sustained each winter. The need for an injection of new cash to do such repairs in 1821 lead to the company reorganization into the Lehigh Coal & Navigation Company, which also bought out George Hauto's share and left White and Hazard with majority ownership; having injected most additional funding from their own pockets.<ref
 name=BHoCC/> In 1823 the upper four locks on the Lehigh Navigation from Lehigh Gap to Mauch Chunk were rebuilt as proof of concept test beds with a spacious bi-directional long lock system.
White had offered the legislature to build a ship & steam tug capable two way lock canal system from Mauch Chunk down to Philadelphia along the Lehigh and Delaware in 1823, but was rebuffed in 1824, with the promise the state would build the Delaware Canal. Lehigh Coal & Navigation Company had to build coal arks and exhausted thousands of acres of timberlands for the one-time, single use boats, costing the company dearly while the state delayed.

 Delaware Division Canal Company – The State of Pennsylvania had embarrassed itself with a botched canal ditch construction some  the terminii of the Lehigh Canal from Easton and parallel to the Delaware River to Bristol, a suburb of North Philadelphia. In 1831 after it opened and leaked prodigiously, the commonwealth had to ask Josiah White to step in and repair the new ditch, then, common sense injected, asked the Lehigh Coal & Navigation Company to operate the venture when his fixes enabled it to open in 1834. Consequently, the company spawned the Lehigh Navigation Coal Company subsidiary, which operated both canals into the 1930s. In mid-1832 White's men had repaired the most egregiously leaking sections well enough to begin operations, and the company spun-off the Lehigh Navigation Coal Company the LNC Co., a subsidiary operating company with its own management.

Mill Parks
Founders White and Hazard were at first, mill and foundry owners acting decisively to secure fuel for their main businesses prior to 1815's application for right-of-way legislation and optioning the sad-sack LCMC operations. In 1814, the partners had actually invested first in the rival Schuylkill Canal where they'd become disgusted with the planning, funding, and lack of commitment by other board members—their concerns take on added weight given the Schuylkill didn't operate until 1823 when the company blazed the way. White's innovative Bear Trap lock-gate and system was based on creating a triggerable artificial flood, depending upon water flow to float the boats past the rapids obstructions. It is little wonder that as he surveyed the Lehigh, he also made note where a water-powered mill could be harnessed, and the legislative act would effectively give the LNC ownership of the entire river. These rights were not released back to Pennsylvania until 1964.

So once 'emergency' improvements on the canal used its founder's knowledge and experience on the Little Schuylkill to develop the waterpower sites along its waterways into early industrial parks. By 1840, the Abbott Street area near Lock 47, now part of Easton's Hugh Moore Park, employed over 1,000 men in almost a dozen factories. This fostered the industries of Allentown, Bethlehem, and their products and the connection with the Delaware Canal, managed for the state by the company after 1834<ref, the development of the Industrial Revolution of greater Philadelphia.

Upper Lehigh Canal
With rights of eminent domain granted by the 1837 revisions to the Main Line of Public Works legislation, the  Lower Lehigh Navigation was extended upriver another  (the Upper Lehigh Canal) through the Lehigh Gorge from Jim Thorpe to White Haven and completed in 1843, giving it the largest carrying capacity of any U.S. canal.

Lehigh and Susquehanna Railroad

With a unified legislative and executive push, the company spun off a subsidiary to build a railroad connection to the Susquehanna at Pittston just north of Wilkes-Barre over very rough terrain. The multi-modal project used a cable railroad called the Ashley Planes, and double-tracked connecting trackage from its foot at Ashley to the barge docks of Pittston and eventually linked up with the seven first-class railroads that drove spurs into the valley to haul anthracite. The Ashley Planes summit end connected to an assembly yard at Mountain Top, Pennsylvania, and sourced a steep double-tracked rail branch to White Haven where it had loading docks with a meeting of transport technologies feeding a new extension of its Lehigh Canal through the difficult terrain of the Lehigh Gorge. With the political push to connect Philadelphia and the Delaware River to the Northern Coal Fields in the Wyoming Valley and the Susquehanna River, the company formed the Lehigh and Susquehanna Railroad empowered with rights of eminent domain. Eventually, both the LC&N Company's Lehigh Navigation and the L&SRR were extended upriver through the Lehigh Gorge from Jim Thorpe to White Haven.

Other railroads

By the later 1820s through the mid-1830s, the civic and business leaders of Pennsylvania, Delaware, and southern New Jersey were anxious to connect their young factories with the markets of the trans-Appalachian territories being settled by tens of thousands of westward migrants. To compete with the B&O Railroad and Erie Canal, they launched the Main Line of Public Works to benefit the manufacturers of the Delaware Valley region.

The company built a succession of small but influential short-line railways as joint ventures with other investors, each of which concurrently solved an earlier irrealizable and intractable civil construction project. Ownership and operations of all these, as well as their initial railway, the Mauch Chunk & Summit Hill Railway, were ultimately combined under the umbrella of their second, the Lehigh and Susquehanna Railroad (Today, this is a holding company that owns and leases the trackage rights to more visible operating road companies for many important rail corridors in northeast Pennsylvania.)
Subsidiary shortlines
 Nesquehoning & Mahanoy Railroad: Having gained civil engineering experience running a freight line through most of the length of the Lehigh River and across the Delaware River, the company chafed at the transport bottleneck of the Panther Creek Valley. With the increasing power of locomotives, the company surveyed and pushed a seven-mile grade up through the winding slopes north of the Nesquehoning Ridge, with several descents, connecting near Hazelton, and the wider valleys of Mahanoy Creek, including that at Tamaqua, Pennsylvania, along the Little Schuylkill River near the outlet of Panther Creek. From Tamaqua, tracks also reached along the Schuylkill Valley to feed the industries of Reading, Pennsylvania, and surrounds.
 Panther Creek Railroad: Having reached Tamaqua, the company built the PCR to reach the main coal-bearing lands 5 to 6 miles to the east up the Panther Creek Valley.
 Hauto Tunnel: Shipping large heavy coal consists over the steep gradients of the Nesquehoning shortline was costly, so eventually the company cut a mile-long tunnel through Nesquehoning Ridge into downtown Lansford, Pennsylvania, which became for a time the seat of its corporate headquarters. This gave the company three means of bringing coal from its mines along Pisgah Ridge and Nesquehoning Mountain until it sold the Mauch Chunk Switchback Railway, which was operating mostly as a prime tourist attraction: the world's first roller coaster.

Lehigh and New England Railroad
The acquisition of the Lehigh and New England<ref
 name="Fading">EX-EXECUTIVE RECALLS DECLINE AND FALL OF LEHIGH COAL AND NAVIGATION CO.  </ref> allowed the company to stop leasing rights to the CNJ and transfer them instead to the new acquisition.

Decline
In 1932, the Lehigh Navigation was closed after maintenance expenses surpassed operating revenues.

By the middle of the 20th century, Lehigh Coal & Navigation Company, once a widely diversified company, had become largely dependent on coal revenues, while subsidiaries owned the railroads and other more-profitable arms. The softening of demand for coal, as railroads replaced steam locomotives with diesels and other forms of heating came into wider use, cut deeply into corporate profits. Consequently, various boards oversaw gradual contraction of the company and sales of bits and pieces. In 1966, Greenwood Stripping Co. bought the remaining coal properties, most located as originally exploited along the Panther Creek Valley, and sold them eight years later to Bethlehem Mines Corp.

In 1986, shareholders dissolved the company after it sold its last business, Cella's Chocolate Covered Cherries, to Tootsie Roll.

The new company 
The company name remained associated with anthracite mining through the independently founded and otherwise unrelated Lehigh Coal and Navigation Company, incorporated in 1988. While unrelated legally, the 'New Company''' as it is known in the area was spearheaded by a previous officer and stockholder: James J. Curran Jr. took over Lehigh Coal from Bethlehem Mines Corp. in 1989, and through the 1990s it remained the largest producer of U.S. anthracite, which is now a specialty product. In 2000, Lehigh Coal shut down and laid-off 163 employees, saying plunging coal prices made it impossible to make a profit. The company reopened in 2001 with help of a last-resort $9 million loan from the U.S. Department of Agriculture. In 2010, in bankruptcy proceedings once again, the company was purchased by one of its bigger creditors at auction, BET Associates, who were affiliated with Toll Brothers. The company properties in between Lansford and Nesquehoning, boasting an EPA permit sign in the same Lehigh Coal and Navigation Company'' name at the company gates along Rt-209 were observed in operation during mid-July 2013.

See also
 Lehigh Canal
 Lehigh and Susquehanna Railroad
 Panther Creek Valley

Notes

References

Sources

Footnotes

External links
 Switch-Back Gravity Railroad: Proprietary photos touring the Lehigh Coal & Navigation's Mauch Chunk Switchback Railway, the second continuously operating railway in North America, the first to carry passengers, the first long railway (i.e. over 5 miles), the first to carry paying passengers, the first tourism railway, acknowledged as the first roller coaster, after which The Switchback, the first amusement park roller coaster was named.

1822 establishments in Pennsylvania
1986 disestablishments in Pennsylvania
Anthracite Coal Region of Pennsylvania
Coal companies of the United States
Defunct companies based in Pennsylvania
Defunct mining companies of the United States
History of Allentown, Pennsylvania
Industrial Revolution
Companies based in Carbon County, Pennsylvania
American companies established in 1822
Energy companies established in 1822
Non-renewable resource companies disestablished in 1986
Shipping companies of the United States
Transport companies established in 1822
Transport companies disestablished in 1988